Dominik Brunnhübner (born 29 August 1990) is German football goalkeeper who is currently a free agent.

Career 
On 30 May 2016, Brunnhübner extended his contract with Würzburger Kickers until 2018.

References

External links 
 
 

1990 births
Living people
German footballers
3. Liga players
1. FC Nürnberg II players
Würzburger Kickers players

Association football midfielders